is a municipality in Agder county, Norway. It is located in the traditional district of Lister. The administrative centre of the municipality is the town of Alleen. Some of the main villages in Lyngdal include Austad, Byremo, Fleseland, Hæåk, Konsmo, Korshamn, Kvås, Skomrak, Svenevik, and Vivlemo.

The municipal economy centers around wood processing, agriculture, and commerce. Tourism is also central to the community, with the beaches along the Lyngdalsfjorden and Rosfjorden being popular resorts during the summer.

The  municipality is the 177th largest by area out of the 356 municipalities in Norway. Lyngdal is the 108th most populous municipality in Norway with a population of 10,480.

General information

The parish of Aa was established as the municipality of Lyngdal on 1 January 1838 (see formannskapsdistrikt law). On 1 January 1909, the municipality was split into three: Austad in the south (population: 1,263), Kvås in the north (population: 736) and Lyngdal in the central area (population: 2,698). During the 1960s, there were many municipal mergers across Norway due to the work of the Schei Committee. On 1 January 1964, the municipalities of Austad (population: 608), Kvås (population: 493), Lyngdal (population: 2,916) as well as the Gitlevåg area (population: 103) in Spangereid municipality, west of Lenesfjorden, were all merged to form one large municipality of Lyngdal. On 1 January 1971, the Ytre Skarstein and Indre Skarstein areas of Lyngdal (population: 21) was transferred to the neighboring municipality of Farsund. On 1 January 2001, the municipality of Lyngdal declared that the municipal centre of Alleen would be a town called Lyngdal.

On 1 January 2020, the neighboring municipalities of Audnedal and Lyngdal merged into a new, larger municipality called Lyngdal.

Name
The municipality is named after the Lyngdalen valley in which the municipality is located. The Old Norse form of the name was Lygnudalr. The first element is the genitive case of the river name Lygna and the last element is dalr which means "valley" or "dale". The river name is derived from logn which means "quietness" and so the meaning is "the quiet one". Prior to 1908, the parish (but not the municipality) of Lyngdal was called Aa, named after the vicarage. The name of the vicarage was first mentioned in 1312 as "a Am", the dative plural of á which means '(small) river'. The farm lies between two rivers.

Coat of arms
The current coat of arms was approved for use starting on 1 January 2020. The arms have a green field (background) and the charge is a tree on top of three wavy lines. The tree and wavy lines have a tincture of argent which means it is commonly colored white, but if it is made out of metal, then silver is used. The tree symbolizes growth. It has nine leaves symbolizing the nine main population centres within Lyngdal. The wavy lines represent waves and meadows. There are three white lines to represent the three large rivers in the municipality: Lygna, Audna, and Mandalselva. The two green wavy lines (between the white wavy lines represent the two valleys in the municipality: Lyngdalen and Audnedalen. The arms were designed by Richard Haugland.

The old coat of arms was granted on 27 March 1987 and in use until 1 January 2020. The official blazon was "Vert a cow statant argent". This means the arms had a green field (background) and the charge was a cow that was facing to the left. The cow had a tincture of argent which meant it was commonly colored white, but if it was made out of metal, then silver was used. The cow was chosen since the local breed of cows has been very well known across Norway since the 19th century. The yearly cattle fair traders from all over Southern Norway and Western Norway visit the municipality to get cows. The arms were designed by Torgeir Schjølberg.

Churches

The Church of Norway has five parishes within the municipality of Lyngdal. It is part of the Lister og Mandal prosti (deanery) in the Diocese of Agder og Telemark.

History

The island of Sælør on the southern coast of the municipality is mentioned in Snorre, as the king Saint Olav spent a winter here in 1028. Based around the port of Agnefest, Lyngdal prospered on maritime trade, and in 1771 an application was made for status as a small coastal town. Its coastal location also facilitated emigration; in the 17th and 18th century largely to the Dutch Republic, and in the 19th century to the United States.

Even before the merger of the municipalities in 1964, the parishes of Austad and Kvås, together with Å (or Aa - Lyngdal proper), made up the greater Lyngdal parish. A census from 1801 showed 3529 inhabitants in the area that today makes up Lyngdal: 1850 in Å, 929 in Austad, 585 in Kvås and 165 in the eastern part of Spangereid. The number today is approximately 8000 inhabitants.

Religious life and missionary work have always had a strong position in Lyngdal, and worthy of special note is the minister Gabriel Kielland (1796–1854), who served in the parish from 1837 to 1854, and his wife Gustava (1800–1889). Known today as a missionary pioneer and a popular songwriter, Gustava also wrote one of the first autobiographies by a woman in Norway: her "Reminiscence from my Life" from 1880.

Geography

Lyngdal is a coastal municipality that and borders Lindesnes municipality to the east, Evje og Hornnes and Åseral to the north, Hægebostad and Kvinesdal and Farsund to the west. Lyngdal municipality includes the southern portion of the Lyngdalen valley which follows the river Lygna to the Lyngdalsfjorden in the west. The Lenesfjorden, Grønsfjorden, and Rosfjorden also are located in the southern part of Lyngdal. As part of Lyngdal village there is Agnefest on site in the south with a natural harbour at Rosfjorden; the harbour is registered since 1771.

Climate

Government
All municipalities in Norway, including Lyngdal, are responsible for primary education (through 10th grade), outpatient health services, senior citizen services, unemployment and other social services, zoning, economic development, and municipal roads. The municipality is governed by a municipal council of elected representatives, which in turn elect a mayor.  The municipality falls under the Agder District Court and the Agder Court of Appeal.

Municipal council
The municipal council of Lyngdal is made up of 29 representatives that are elected to four year terms. Currently, the party breakdown is as follows:

Transportation
Bus lines from/through Lyngdal Bus Terminal:

Notable people 

 Teis Lundegaard (1774 in Austad – 1856) a Norwegian farmer, shipowner and politician
 Abraham Berge (1851 in Lyngdal – 1936) politician, Prime Minister of Norway 1923 to 1924
 Kristian Andvord (1855 in Lyngdal – 1934) a physician and medical researcher into tuberculosis
 Theodore Abrahamson (1900 in Lyngdal - 1978) dairy farmer and politician; Mayor of Tigerton, Wisconsin
 Kjell Elvis (born 1968) a Norwegian professional Elvis Presley impersonator, lives in Lyngdal

Sport 
 Ingvild Stensland (born 1981) footballer, 144 caps for Norway women, grew up in Lyngdal
 Stefan Strandberg (born 1990 in Lyngdal) a footballer with 230 club caps and 12 for Norway
 Zlatko Tripić (born 1992) a Norwegian-Bosnian footballer with over 200 club caps, grew up in Lyngdal
Julian Ryerson (born 1997), a Norwegian-American footballer playing for Borussia Dortmund in Germany, born in Lyngdal.

References

External links

Municipal fact sheet from Statistics Norway 
Municipal website 

 
Municipalities of Agder
1838 establishments in Norway